The 1998 North Queensland Cowboys season was the 4th in the club's history. Coached by Tim Sheens and captained by John Lomax, they competed in the inaugural season of the newly formed National Rugby League (NRL) competition.

Season summary 
After a disappointing 1997 season, the Cowboys entered the newly unified National Rugby League competition with high hopes. While the squad from a year earlier was kept mostly the same, the club added former Australia and Queensland representative and local favourite Dale Shearer, veteran forward Dale Fritz from the recently folded Perth Reds and former Canberra Raiders flyer Noa Nadruku, who reunited with coach Tim Sheens.

The year got off to the best start possible, as the club went on a four-game winning streak, the first time they'd won three and four games in a row. They then bounced back from a big loss to Brisbane in Round 5, with a 17-4 win over Newcastle. After six rounds, the club sat in equal 1st on 10 competition points and a maiden finals appearance looked to be a real possibility.

It turned out to be false dawn, as a five-game losing streak followed. The club would then make history in Round 12, defeating the Penrith Panthers 36-28, after trailing 26-0 at half time. As of 2019, this still stands as the biggest comeback victory in Australian first grade history. They followed that up with another milestone, recording 40 points in a game for the first time, defeating the Western Suburbs Magpies 40-10. Over the last 10 rounds, the club would win just two games, finishing in 16th place after such a promising start to the season. The club's lone representative in 1998, New Zealand's John Lomax, was named Player of the Year and Players' Player.

The club blooded two talented 18-year-olds during the season, Moranbah's Josh Hannay and Mt Isa's Scott Prince. Hannay, whose planned debut in 1996 as a 16-year-old was vetoed by the ARL, played 21 games and was the club's top try and point scorer. He went onto set numerous point scoring records for the club, playing 150 games over nine seasons, and representing Queensland on two occasions. Prince, a Junior Kangaroo in 1998, played 16 games (10 of those off the bench) and would play 53 games over three seasons before joining the Cowboys' arch-rivals, the Brisbane Broncos, in 2001. In 2005, he guided the Wests Tigers to their maiden premiership, defeating the Cowboys in the Grand Final.

Milestones 
 Round 1: Dale Fritz, Noa Nadruku, Dale Shearer and Scott Wilson made their debuts for the club.
 Round 2: Ray Mercy became the first player to score four tries in a match for the club.
 Round 3: Josh Hannay made his NRL debut.
 Round 3: The club won three games in a row for the first time.
 Round 4: Scott Prince made his NRL debut.
 Round 4: The club won four games in a row for the first time.
 Round 12: The club overcame a 26-0 half time deficit to defeat Penrith 36-28 (Biggest comeback in NSWRL/ARL/NRL history).
 Round 13: The club scored 40 points in a game for the first time.
 Round 14: Paul Pensini made his NRL debut.
 Round 19: Scott Donald made his NRL debut.
 Round 20: John Malu made his NRL debut.
 Round 21: Andrew Dunemann played his 50th game for the club, the first player to do so.
 Round 23: Scott Whiting made his NRL debut.
 Round 24: Denny Lambert made his NRL debut.

Squad list

Squad movement

1998 Gains

1998 Losses

Ladder

Fixtures

Regular season

Statistics 

Source:

Representatives 
The following players played a representative match in 1998.

Feeder Clubs

Queensland Cup 
  Townsville Stingers - 7th, missed finals

Honours

Club 
 Player of the Year: John Lomax
 Players' Player: John Lomax
 Club Person of the Year: Scott Mahon

References 

North Queensland Cowboys seasons
North Queensland Cowboys